Admiral Sir Ernest Rice, KCB (24 February 1840 – 15 April 1927) was a Royal Navy officer.

The son of the politician Edward Royd Rice and the brother of Admiral Sir Edward Bridges Rice, Ernest Rice entered HMS Britannia in June 1854. As a midshipman on HMS Odin, he took part in the Crimean War in the Baltic. He was involved in the failed attack on Gamla Carleby (now Kokkola), and was also present at the Battle of Bomarsund and the Bombardment of Sveaborg.

References 

1840 births
1927 deaths
Royal Navy admirals
Knights Commander of the Order of the Bath
Place of birth missing
Place of death missing
Royal Navy personnel of the Crimean War